Juventus Football Club had their least successful season since finishing 12th in the Serie A back in 1961–62. This time, under Luigi Maifredi's coaching, Juventus finished 7th, despite breaking the World record in terms of transfer fee, to bring in Fiorentina star striker Roberto Baggio. Being long involved in the Scudetto race, Juventus lost the plot in the second half of the season, barely winning a match in a ten-game spell, which caused the side to drop down to the upper midfield.

Squad

 (Captain)

Transfers

Competitions

Supercoppa Italiana

Serie A

League table

Results by round

Matches

Coppa Italia 

Second round

Eightfinals

Quarterfinals

European Cup Winners' Cup

First round

Second round

Quarter-finals

Semi-finals

Statistics

Players Statistics

References

Juventus F.C. seasons
Juventus